Sulsted Church, located in Sulsted, a small Danish town in northern Jutland, just north of Aalborg, was constructed ca. 1150-1200  and features a large number of frescos or kalkmalerier, all created in 1548 by Hans Maler from Randers.

Frescos
Unlike other frescos in Danish churches, Sulsted's murals were not concealed with limewash after the Reformation and have survived to this day.

The frescos, which decorate the ceiling of the nave, depict the life of Jesus starting with his birth in the first section at the west end of the nave, continue with the beginning of his passion in the second or central section and end with his death on the cross in the third most easterly section. Those in the choir are of other New Testament images related to the creed and to the Virgin Mary.

References

Sources
 Raakjær, Ole: Sulsted Kirke,  / . In Danish.
 Lillie, Eva Louise: Tradition og fornyelse : kalkmalerierne fra 1548 i Sulsted kirke, in Kirkehistoriske samlinger, 1985. In Danish.

Church frescos in Denmark
Lutheran churches converted from Roman Catholicism
12th-century churches in Denmark
Buildings and structures in Aalborg Municipality
Churches in the North Jutland Region
1548 paintings
Churches in the diocese of Aalborg
Churches completed in 1200